Khyalganat is an urban-type settlement or village in Khangal sum (district) of Bulgan Province in northern Mongolia.

Khyalganat population is 3,100 (end of 2006), 3,264 (end of 2008).

Geography 
Khyalganat is placed on Selenge river left bank, 25 km North from  Khangal sum center and 
25 km East from  Selenge sum center. Erdenet city is 60 km South from Khyalganat (via 
Khangal sum center).

Economy 
"Khyalganat" factory was set up in 1972 for the forest logging and sawmilling operations.
In the last few years, that industry has not been working to full capacity, thus, the unemployment has increased greatly.

There is a factory in Khyalganat that produces "ECO Lumber Briquettes". These are made from the sawdust waste from the sawmill. These burn longer than standard chopped wood and produce less harmful byproducts than burning coal.

References 

Populated places in Mongolia